"What Do You Want from Me This Time" is a song written and recorded by American country music duo Foster & Lloyd.  It was released in August 1988 as the fourth single from the album Foster & Lloyd.  The song reached #6 on the Billboard Hot Country Singles & Tracks chart.

Charts

Weekly charts

Year-end charts

References

1988 singles
Foster & Lloyd songs
Songs written by Radney Foster
RCA Records singles
Songs written by Bill Lloyd (country musician)
1988 songs